Wayne Arthurs and Paul Hanley were the defending champions.  Arthurs partnered with Michaël Llodra this year, losing in the first round.  Hanley partnered with Kevin Ullyett, winning the title again.

Hanley and Ullyett won in the final 7–6(7–2), 6–4, against Olivier Rochus and Kristof Vliegen.

Seeds

Draw

Draw

External links
Draw

2006 Stockholm Open
2006 ATP Tour